Swallowtail Butterfly (スワロウテイル Suwarōteiru), is a 1996 Japanese crime film directed by Shunji Iwai, starring Hiroshi Mikami, pop-singer Chara, and Ayumi Ito.

The film was shot on hand-held cameras using jump cuts and other visual techniques. It covers a wide array of themes and genres, from social realism to coming-of-age to crime.

A theme song for the film under Yen Town Band, titled "Swallowtail Butterfly (Ai no Uta)", gained first place on the Oricon Weekly Singles Chart of October 7, 1996.

Plot
The film is set in Tokyo at an unspecified point in the near future when the Japanese yen has become the strongest currency in the world. This attracts an influx of immigrants, legal and illegal, to work in the city. The immigrants give the city the nickname . The Japanese natives, however, despise the nickname, and in retribution call the immigrants by the homophone , anglicised as "Yentowns" in the film's English subtitles.

The story centers around a sixteen-year-old girl (Ito) whose mother has just died. The girl is passed on from person to person until she is taken in by a Chinese Yentown prostitute named Glico (Chara), who names her Ageha (Japanese for swallowtail). Under Glico's care, Ageha starts a new life.

The immigrant characters, who speak Japanese, English, Mandarin, or Cantonese, earn their living by committing petty crimes and engaging in prostitution. Ageha does not participate in any of these activities, but is protected by Glico and the other immigrants. The film does not make clear whether Ageha is Japanese or an Asian immigrant.

Eventually, due to a sudden twist of fate, the immigrants are given a chance to realize their various dreams. But in doing so, they destroy their solidarity, and have to face their problems separately.

Cast
 Hiroshi Mikami as Fei Hong
 Chara as Glico
 Ayumi Ito as Ageha
 Yōsuke Eguchi as Ryo Ranki
 Andy Hui as Mao Fu
 Atsuro Watabe as Ran
 Tomoko Yamaguchi as Shen Mei
 Nene Otsuka as Reiko
 Kaori Momoi as Suzukino
 Tadanobu Asano as Customer in club

Awards
 1997 Japanese Academy Awards - Newcomer of the Year (Ayumi Ito)
 1997 Japanese Academy Awards - Most Popular Film
 1998 Fant-Asia Film Festival - Best Asian Film

Swallowtail Butterfly was also nominated for but did not win the following awards:

 1997 Japanese Academy Awards - Best Actress (Chara)
 1997 Japanese Academy Awards - Best Art Direction (Yohei Taneda)
 1997 Japanese Academy Awards - Best Cinematography (Noboru Shinoda)
 1997 Japanese Academy Awards - Best Film
 1997 Japanese Academy Awards - Best Lighting (Yūki Nakamura)
 1997 Japanese Academy Awards - Best Sound (Osamu Takizawa)
 1997 Japanese Academy Awards - Best Supporting Actress (Ayumi Ito)
 1997 Moscow Film Festival - Golden St. George Award

References

External links

1996 crime films
1996 films
Dystopian films
Films about immigration
Films directed by Shunji Iwai
Films produced by Kazutoshi Wadakura
Japanese crime films
1990s Japanese-language films
Mandarin-language films
Yakuza films
1990s English-language films
1990s Japanese films